Marek Benda (born 10 November 1968) is a Czech politician and member of the Civic Democratic Party. He is currently the longest serving member of the Chamber of Deputies of the Czech Republic. He is the son of Václav Benda.

Biography
Benda studied at the Faculty of Mathematics and Physics, Charles University from 1988 to 1990. He left the school during the Velvet Revolution as he was involved in politics. He later unsuccessfully studied at the Faculty of Arts, Charles University in Prague but failed due to his poor knowledge of foreign languages. Benda later studied law at the University of West Bohemia from 2003 to 2008. He reportedly passed a post-masters examination and earned a Doctor degree, but it was later revealed that his post-masters thesis was merely a work of plagiarism and he did not receive the degree.

Political career
Benda became a member of parliament in 1990. He co-founded the Christian Democratic Party (KDS). KDS was later merged with the Civic Democratic Party (ODS). Benda then became a member of ODS.

References

1968 births
Living people
Politicians from Prague
Civic Democratic Party (Czech Republic) MPs
Christian Democratic Party (Czech Republic) politicians
University of West Bohemia alumni
Members of the Chamber of Deputies of the Czech Republic (2017–2021)
Members of the Chamber of Deputies of the Czech Republic (2013–2017)
Members of the Chamber of Deputies of the Czech Republic (2010–2013)
Members of the Chamber of Deputies of the Czech Republic (2006–2010)
Members of the Chamber of Deputies of the Czech Republic (2002–2006)
Members of the Chamber of Deputies of the Czech Republic (1998–2002)
Members of the Chamber of Deputies of the Czech Republic (1996–1998)
Members of the Chamber of Deputies of the Czech Republic (1992–1996)
Members of the Chamber of Deputies of the Czech Republic (2021–2025)